Paul Banks may refer to:

Paul Banks (American musician) (born 1978), lead singer of New York City-based band Interpol
Paul Banks (English musician) (born 1973), lead guitarist of band Shed Seven, also with the Riding and Albion
Paul N. Banks (1934–2000), American librarian

See also
Paul Banke (born 1964), American boxer
Paul Banks and Carolyn Harris Preservation Award, by the Association for Library Collections and Technical Services (ALCTS)